John Amos "Spike" Jones (born July 9, 1947 in Louisville, Georgia) is a former American football punter who played eight years in the National Football League mainly for the Buffalo Bills and the Philadelphia Eagles.

References

External links
NFL.com player page

1947 births
Living people
People from Louisville, Georgia
American football punters
Georgia Bulldogs football players
Houston Oilers players
Buffalo Bills players
Philadelphia Eagles players